Mrigya is an Indian World fusion music band from New Delhi that was formed in 1999. It music is a fusion of Blues, Folk, Funk, Latin, Rock and Jazz along with Indian classical music. Over the years the band has played at national and international music festivals.

History
The band was initially formed as a jam band project for a music club called "Friends of Music" and was originally christened "Mrigaya" (Sanskrit for "hunt") by Indraneel Hariharan. A misprint in the promotion flyer named the newly formed outfit as "Mrigya". The band decided to retain this new name born out of that amusing incident.

Band members
The founding members consisted of Rajat Kakkar on percussions (and, later, on drums), Sharat Chandra Srivastava on Hindustani violin, Indraneel Hariharan on electric bass, Sonam Sherpa on electric guitar, Gyan Singh on tabla and Indian percussion, and Ashwani Verma on drums.

The current band-members are as follows:
 Sharat Chandra Srivastava: violin
 Karan Sharma: guitar
 Indraneel Hariharan: bass guitar
 Sacchin Kapoor: keyboards
 Gyan Singh: tabla
 Rajat Kakkar: drums
 Sukriti Sen: Hindustani classical vocals
 Jagtinder Singh Sidhu: Sufi vocals

Discography
 World Harmony, Virgin/EMI Records 2010
 Mrigya, Times Music 2015

Major International performances
 Southbank Centre, London - 2001
 Edinburgh Fringe Festival - 2001 and 2002
 Dubai Jazz Festival - 2003
 New Zealand Arts Festival - 2004
 Singapore Kalautsavam - 2004
 Jazz by the lake, Johannesburg - 2007 and 2010
 The Bassline , Johannesburg - 2007
 ICC Arena, Durban - 2007
 Blue Lagoon, Durban - 2007
 Jazz Club, Durban - 2007
 Artscape, Cape Town - 2007
 V & A Waterfront, Cape Town - 2007
 Pretoria University - 2007, 2010
 City Hall, Durban - 2010
 Gandhi Hall, Lenasia - 2010
 Bolshoi Theatre, Moscow - 2009
 Rimsky-Korsakov Conservatory, St. Petersburg - 2009
 Indian high Commission, Berlin - 2007
 UFA Fabrik, Berlin - 2007
 Beit Schmuel Hall, Jerusalem - 2011
 Reading 3, Tel Aviv - 2011
 Gwanghwamun Plaza, Seoul - 2011
 Busan International Rock Festival - 2011
 Vancouver Folk Festival - 2012  
 Square roots festival, Chicago - 2012
 Bibliotheca Alexandrina, Alexandria - 2013

Awards
 Herald Angel Award, Scotland, 2002 
 Tap Water Award, Scotland, 2002 
 Artists for Change Karmaveer Puraskaar, India, 2012

References

External links
 'Ganga'
 'Pahari Funk'
 'Rock the Raag'

Indian musical groups
Musical groups established in 1999
Culture of Delhi
Virgin Records artists
World music groups
1999 establishments in Delhi